Jeannette: The Childhood of Joan of Arc is a 2017 French musical film directed by Bruno Dumont. It was screened in the Directors' Fortnight section at the 2017 Cannes Film Festival. It was followed two years later by the non-musical sequel Joan of Arc which premiered at the 2019 Cannes Film Festival, written and directed by Dumont and with Lise Leplat Prudhomme reprising her role. The script is an adaptation of the play The Mystery of the Charity of Joan of Arc, written in 1910 by the Catholic author Charles Péguy.

Plot
Set in France during the Hundred Years' War, the film portrays Joan of Arc's religious awakening and her decision to fight against the English invasion.

Cast
 Lise Leplat Prudhomme as Jeannette
 Jeanne Voisin as Jeannette (older)
 Lucile Gauthier as Hauviette (8 year)
 Victoria Lefebvre as Hauviette (13 year)
 Aline Charles as Madame Gervaise / Sainte Marguerite
 Elise Charles as Madame Gervaise / Sainte Catherine
 Nicolas Leclaire as Durand Lassois
 Anaïs Rivière as Saint Michel
 Gery De Poorter as Jacques d'Arc
 Regine Delalin as Isabeau d'Arc

Release
The film had its world premiere in the Directors' Fortnight section at the 2017 Cannes Film Festival. It was released in France on 6 September 2017.

Reception

Critical reception
Review aggregator website Rotten Tomatoes gives the film a score of 74% based on 34 reviews, with an average rating of 6.6/10. The website's critical consensus reads, "Its unusual approach may not pay off quite as consistently as one might hope, but the boldly anachronistic Jeannette: The Childhood of Joan of Arc is definitely a biopic like no other." On Metacritic, the film has a weighted average score of 62 out of 100, based on 14 critics, indicating "generally favorable reviews".

In the Boston Globe, Ty Burr described the film as "very likely the first medieval heavy-metal musical ever to grace the silver screen" and "deeply and unsettlingly strange", providing "genuine oddball pleasures amid stretches of real tedium". Simon Abrams of RogerEbert.com gave the film 3 1/2 out of 4 stars, calling it "a challenging arthouse drama that has a slippery sense of humor and a whole lot of chutzpah." Sam C. Mac of Slant Magazine said, "As an exploration of Joan of Arc in cinema narrative, the film isn't as rich and substantial as Bresson's The Trial of Joan of Arc or Dreyer's The Passion of Joan of Arc, but Dumont's more flexible sense of spiritualism makes it nonetheless compelling."

Conversely, Jordan Mintzer of The Hollywood Reporter said, "The acting outside the singing is often on the level of a class play, and the repetition of musical numbers and kitschy dances can grow tiresome to say the least, but you have to give Dumont credit for making something so silly seem so filled with conviction." Peter Debruge of Variety called it "a blasphemous assault on French history, religion, and the musical genre."

Cahiers du cinéma placed the film at number 2 on its list of the top 10 films of 2017.

Accolades

See also
 Joan of Arc
 Cultural depictions of Joan of Arc

References

External links
 

2017 films
2010s musical films
French films based on plays
French musical films
2010s French-language films
Films directed by Bruno Dumont
Films about Joan of Arc
Rock musicals
2010s French films